Gliwickie Towarzystwo Koszykówki Gliwice, shortly GTK Gliwice, is a professional basketball club based in Gliwice, Poland. The team currently plays in the first level Polish Basketball League.

History
The club was founded in 1998 and initially focussed on youth teams and developing young players. In 2006, the club reached the III Liga, the fourth highest level in Polish basketball. In 2010, the team promoted to the II Liga and in 2014 the club was invited to join the I Liga. After the club finished as the runner-up in the 2016–17 season, Gliwice was invited to join the PLK for the 2017–18 season.

Since 2018, Gliwice plays in the Gliwice Arena, changing between its big hall and training hall.

On 26 May 2020, Gliwice signed German Matthias Zollner as new head coach.

Players

Current roster

Notable players

  Quinton Hooker
  Terrance Ferguson
  Malachi Richardson

Season by season

Logos

References

External links
Facebook page

Basketball teams established in 1998
Basketball teams in Poland